In Greek mythology, Eribotes (Ancient Greek: Ἐρυβώτης) was a Locrian who was counted among the Argonauts. He was the son of Teleon.

Mythology 
Eribotes appears to have had skills of a physician: in the Argonautica, he attends on Oileus when the latter is wounded by a feather of a Stymphalian bird.

One the return trip, Eribotes along with Canthus died. They were slain in Libya by the shepherd Cephalion, son of the nymph Tritonis and Amphithemis, whose flocks they were plundering.

Notes

References 
 Apollonius Rhodius, Argonautica translated by Robert Cooper Seaton (1853-1915), R. C. Loeb Classical Library Volume 001. London, William Heinemann Ltd, 1912. Online version at the Topos Text Project.
 Apollonius Rhodius, Argonautica. George W. Mooney. London. Longmans, Green. 1912. Greek text available at the Perseus Digital Library.
 Gaius Julius Hyginus, Fabulae from The Myths of Hyginus translated and edited by Mary Grant. University of Kansas Publications in Humanistic Studies. Online version at the Topos Text Project.
 Gaius Valerius Flaccus, Argonautica translated by Mozley, J H. Loeb Classical Library Volume 286. Cambridge, MA, Harvard University Press; London, William Heinemann Ltd. 1928. Online version at theio.com.
 Gaius Valerius Flaccus, Argonauticon. Otto Kramer. Leipzig. Teubner. 1913. Latin text available at the Perseus Digital Library.

Argonauts
Characters in the Argonautica

Locrian characters in Greek mythology
Locrian mythology